The Russian Anonymous Marketplace or RAMP was a Russian language forum with users selling a variety of drugs on the Dark Web.

With over 14,000 members, the site uses Tor and uses some escrow features like Silk Road-like darknet markets, but otherwise many deals take place off-site using off-the-record messaging. It is the longest lived darknet market, running from September 2012 to July 2017, inspired by the success of the Silk Road.

The administrator who goes by the handle 'Darkside', claims the site makes around $250,000 a year and avoids law enforcement attention due to its predominant Russian user base and its ban on the sale of goods and services such as hacking.

From July 2017, users were unable to login due to DDOS attacks. On September 19th 2017, the Russian Ministry of Internal Affairs confirmed the site had been terminated in July.

References 

Crime forums
Russian-language websites
Defunct darknet markets